Catedral Basílica de Nuestra Señora del Valle is a basilica cathedral in San Fernando del Valle de Catamarca, Catamarca Province, Argentina. It is dedicated to the Virgen del Valle.

Description
The church has a nave and two side chapels. The floors are of marble mosaic with geometric decorations. The main altar is made of white Carrara marble. The facade is framed by two towers at its lateral ends.

References

External links
 Catedral Basílica de Nuestra Señora del Valle at catamarcaguia.com.ar

Basilica churches in Argentina
Roman Catholic cathedrals in Argentina
Catholic Church in Argentina